Streptaxoidea is a superfamily of air-breathing land snails, terrestrial pulmonate gastropod mollusks in the suborder Achatinina of the order Stylommatophora.

Taxonomy

2005 taxonomy 
There have been recognized the only family Streptaxidae within Streptaxoidea in the taxonomy of Bouchet & Rocroi (2005).

2010 taxonomy 
Sutcharit et al. (2010) have established a new family Diapheridae within Streptaxoidea as follows:

 family Streptaxidae Gray, 1860
 family Diapheridae Panha & Naggs, 2010

Rowson et al. (2011) have confirmed monophyly of Streptaxidae and Diapheridae as its sister group.

References 

Stylommatophora
Taxa named by John Edward Gray